Edward Joshua Bonilla (born September 8, 1988) is an American television and film actor. He is best known for his role as Rafe Rivera on Guiding Light.

Early life
Bonilla was born in Brooklyn to Puerto Rican parents. He attended John Ericsson Junior High School 126 in Greenpoint, Brooklyn, where he became involved in poetry, dance, and band, playing the trumpet. He also participated in musical theater while in junior high school and high school.  Bonilla attended high school for Environmental Studies. He first became interested in acting in the ninth-grade, when he was cast as Danny Zuko in a performance of Grease. He graduated from high school in 2006 and then attended Bard College.

Career
His first role was a non-union commercial for a Hilary Duff film called Raise Your Voice. After graduating from high school, he went on to  originate the role of Rafe, Natalia Rivera Aitoro son, on Guiding Light in May 2007.

Bonilla starred in the independent film Musical Chairs. It is a story of a couple (played by Bonilla and actress Leah Pipes) who enter a wheelchair ballroom dancing competition after the girl is disabled in a traffic accident. The film was released on March 23, 2012.

Bonilla received an Imagen Award nomination for his performance as "Dexter," a former high school basketball player whose best days are behind him, in Joshua Sanchez's directorial debut, Four. The film was released on September 13, 2013.

Awards

Filmography

Feature films

Television

References

External links

interview
Biography from soapnet.go.com

1988 births
Living people
21st-century American male actors
American male film actors
American male soap opera actors
American people of Puerto Rican descent
Bard College alumni
Male actors from New York City
People from Brooklyn